Dengzhou Subdistrict is a subdistrict of Penglai, Shandong, China.

Township-level divisions of Shandong